Fletcher is a town in Comanche County, Oklahoma, United States. The population was 1,177 at the 2010 census. It is included in the Lawton, Oklahoma Metropolitan Statistical Area.

Geography
Fletcher is located at  (34.822445, -98.240643).

Utilities 
Telephone, Internet, and Digital TV Services is provided by Hilliary Communications.

Demographics

As of the census of 2010, there were 1,177 people, 478 households, and 329 families residing in the town. There were 544 housing units at an average density of 661.3 per square mile (255.3/km2). The racial makeup of the town was 87.0% White, 1.9% African American, 5.1% Native American, 0.3% Asian, 0.7% from other races, and 4.8% from two or more races. Hispanic or Latino of any race were 4.1% of the population.

There were 478 households, out of which 30.8% had children under the age of 18 living with them, 56.3% were married couples living together, 9.4% had a female householder with no husband present, and 31.2% were non-families. 27.8% of all households were made up of individuals, and 14.6% had someone living alone who was 65 years of age or older. The average household size was 2.46 and the average family size was 2.97.

In the town, the population was spread out, with 25.7% under the age of 18, 7.8% from 18 to 24, 26.3% from 25 to 44, 22.9% from 45 to 64, and 17.2% who were 65 years of age or older. The median age was 37.3 years. For every 100 females, there were 85.4 males. For every 100 females age 18 and over, there were 84.4 males.

According to the 2000 census, the median income for a household in the town was $27,500, and the median income for a family was $34,028. Males had a median income of $28,594 versus $25,000 for females. The per capita income for the town was $13,329. About 14.0% of families and 14.4% of the population were below the poverty line, including 15.4% of those under age 18 and 15.6% of those age 65 or over.

References

External links
 Encyclopedia of Oklahoma History and Culture - Fletcher
 http://www.fletcher-news.com.html Fletcher news online
 

towns in Comanche County, Oklahoma
towns in Oklahoma